Felis is a genus of small and medium-sized cat species native to most of Africa and south of 60° latitude in Europe and Asia to Indochina. The genus includes the domestic cat.

Genetic studies indicate that the Felinae genera Felis, Otocolobus and Prionailurus diverged from a Eurasian progenitor of the Felidae about 6.2 million years ago, and that Felis species split off 3.04 to 0.99 million years ago.

Etymology
The generic name Felis is derived from Classical Latin fēlis meaning "cat, ferret".

Taxonomy
Carl Linnaeus considered Felis to comprise all cat species known until 1758. Later taxonomists split the cat family into different genera. In 1917, the British zoologist Reginald Innes Pocock revised the genus Felis as comprising only the ones listed in the following table. Estimated genetic divergence times of the listed species are indicated in million years ago (Mya), based on analysis of autosomal, xDNA, yDNA and mtDNA gene segments.

Pocock accepted the Pallas's cat as the only member of the genus Otocolobus. Other scientists consider it also a Felis species.

Several scientists consider the Chinese mountain cat a subspecies of F. silvestris.

Phylogeny
The phylogenetic relationships of living Felis species are shown in the following cladogram:

Fossil Felis species
Fossil Felis species include:
 Felis lunensis (Martelli, 1906)

Characteristics
Felis species have high and wide skulls, short jaws and narrow ears with short tufts, but without any white spots on the back of the ears. Their pupils contract to a vertical slit.
A black cat from Transcaucasia described in 1904 as F. daemon by Satunin turned out to be a feral cat, probably a hybrid of wildcat and domestic cat.
The Kellas cat is a hybrid between domestic cat and European wildcat occurring in Scotland.

The Corsican wildcat is considered to have been introduced to Corsica before the beginning of the 1st millennium. A genetic study of a dozen individuals showed that they are closely related to the African wildcat originating in the Middle East.

References

External links

 
Mammal genera
Messinian first appearances
Extant Miocene first appearances
Taxa named by Carl Linnaeus
Felines